Ram Narayan Sharma /Ram Narain Sharma (31 August 1915 – 11 April 1985) was a freedom fighter, a trade union leader, and a political leader from Dhanbad.

He was imprisoned for 10 and half years by the British for Satyagraha and mass movement in 1941-45.

He was an Indian National Congress politician and served as a member of the 5th Lok Sabha, representing Dhanbad in Jharkhand, India, between 1971 and 1977.

He also represented various constituencies of Dhanbad district in the Bihar Legislative Assembly:
1952 and 1957 he was returned for Tundi cum Nirsa;
1957 to 1962, he represented Nirsa;
1962 to 1967, he was elected for Jorapokhar
1967 to 1968 saw him representing Nirsa once more

See also
List of people from Bihar

References

External links
 List of Indian delegates and advisers to International Labour Conference, (1919-2011)

India MPs 1971–1977
People from Dhanbad district
Indian National Congress politicians
1985 deaths
Bihar MLAs 1952–1957
1915 births
Indian independence activists from Bihar
Prisoners and detainees of British India
Lok Sabha members from Bihar
Bihar MLAs 1957–1962
Bihar MLAs 1962–1967
Bihar MLAs 1967–1969